Piotr Bielczyk (born 17 February 1952 in Warsaw) is a former Polish javelin thrower. He finished 4th in the javelin throw at the 1976 Summer Olympics.

External links

1952 births
Living people
Polish male javelin throwers
Athletes (track and field) at the 1976 Summer Olympics
Olympic athletes of Poland
Athletes from Warsaw
Olympic male javelin throwers
20th-century Polish people